Alexander of Russia may refer to:

 Alexander I of Russia (1777–1825), also known as Alexander the Blessed 
 Alexander II of Russia (1818–1881), also known as Alexander the Liberator
 Alexander III of Russia (1845–1894), also known as Alexander the Peacekeeper